Samuel Mansfield Bubier (June 28, 1816 – October 5, 1894) was a Massachusetts shoe manufacturer and politician who served as a member of the Board of Aldermen and as the 16th Mayor of Lynn, Massachusetts.

Notes

Massachusetts city council members
Mayors of Lynn, Massachusetts
1816 births
1894 deaths
Massachusetts Republicans
19th-century American politicians